Rony Barrak is a Lebanese musician (Darbouka player) and composer.

Rony Barrak held his first Darbouka (Middle Eastern tabla) at the age of four and began playing it intuitively. Led by early self-confidence, he made his first TV performance at the age of seven. At the age of 17, Rony distinguished himself in the world of music by winning the Gold Medal in a competition on the Lebanese Broadcasting Corporation International (LBCI) television for talented young musicians in Lebanon and the Middle East. He moved to London in 1990, where he studied orchestral percussion and drum kit at the Guildhall School of Music and Drama and later taught Middle Eastern Percussion at Trinity College of Music. Rony became a British citizen in year 2000 and has dual citizenship of the U.K. and Lebanon.

Orchestral Compositions 
2014 "Beirut Sensations & Phoenicia" Yerevan, Armenia, with the Academic Theatre Symphonic Orchestra of Yerevan conducted by Karen Drugaryan 
2012 "Boulder Sensations" (world premiere) Boulder, USA With the Boulder Philharmonic Orchestra, conducted by Michael Butterman.
2011 "Phoenicia" (world premiere) & Beirut Sensations, Bremen, Germany, with the Bremer Philharmonic Orchestra, conducted by Markus Poschner and broadcast live on Bremen Radio.
2009 "Beirut Sensations" (world premiere) Boulder, USA.

Awards and honors
2010 Appreciation award by the Ambassador of Lebanon-Buenos Aires-Argentina
2010 Appreciation award by the Juventudo de la uniõn cultural Argentino-Libanesa
2010 Appreciation award by the president of Saint George Hospital
2005 Honorary Citizen of the City Dearborn, Michigan
1988 Gold Medal-Studio al Fan on LBCI Television-Lebanon

Discography
 Aramba (1999)
 Karizma (EMI, 2005)
 Darbouka City (EMI, 2010)

References

External links
www.ronybarrak.com

Year of birth missing (living people)
Living people
Lebanese drummers